Jack Dougherty may refer to:
 Jack Dougherty (ice hockey)
 Jack Dougherty (actor)
 Jack Dougherty (baseball)

See also
 Jack Daugherty (disambiguation)
 John Dougherty (disambiguation)